{{Automatic taxobox
| image =
| image_caption =
| taxon = Japewia
| authority = Tønsberg
| type_species = Japewia tornoënsis
| type_species_authority = (Nyl.) Tønsberg
| subdivision_ranks = Species
| subdivision = J. subaurifera
J. tornoënsis
}}Japewia is a genus of lichenized fungi in the family Ramalinaceae.

The genus name of Japewia'' is in honour of Peter Wilfrid James (1930 - 2014), who was an English botanist (Mycology and Lichenology), who worked at the  Natural History Museum, London.

The genus was circumscribed by Tor Tønsberg in Lichenologist vol.22 (issue 3) on page 205 in 1990.

References

Ramalinaceae
Lichen genera
Lecanorales genera